Qurini (Aymara chuqi, quri (<Quechua) gold, -ni a suffix to indicate ownership, "the one with gold", Hispanicized spelling Corini) is a mountain in the Peruvian Andes, about  high. It is situated in the Moquegua Region, Mariscal Nieto Province, Carumas District, and in the Puno Region, Puno Province, Acora District. Qurini lies northwest of the mountain Wilaquta and north of the lake Aqhuyach'alla (Pasto Grande).

References

Mountains of Moquegua Region
Mountains of Puno Region
Mountains of Peru